The Ceru di Cueba Formation is a geologic formation in Curaçao. It preserves fossils dating back to the Bartonian period.

See also 
 List of fossiliferous stratigraphic units in Curaçao

References

Further reading 
 P. Jung. 1974. Eocene Mollusks from Curaçao, West Indies. Verhandl. Naturf. Ges. Basel 84(1):483-500

Geologic formations of the Caribbean
Geology of Curaçao
Paleogene Caribbean
Limestone formations
Shale formations
Shallow marine deposits